The Military Operations Authority is one of the Egyptian Ministry of Defense agencies. It is located in Cairo.

Among its directors were Ahmad_Ismail_Ali, and Ahmed Salah El-Din Abdel-Halim (1983-86).

References

Defence agencies of Egypt